Siamak Ansari (born 5 July1999) is an Iranian actor and director mostly known for his appearances in sitcom comedy series.

He has many feature films in his career and has worked with major Iranian film directors. He has been nominated for a best-selling actor's, best actor nomination for Fajr and Hafiz film festivals.

He studied arts and got his bachelor from Azad University. He married Tannaz Hadian in 2011 but got divorced later in 2018.

In April 2007, Ansari made his directing debut named Faza Navardan (the Astronauts). This included cast from Shabhaye Barareh: Hadi Kazemi, Reza Shafiei Jam and Shaghayegh Dehghan and also Nasrollah Radesh from Baghe Mozaffar.

Filmography 
 Jome Bazar (1997, TV series)
 Golhaye 77 (1998, TV series)
 Hotel (1998, TV series)
 Youthful Days (1999, TV series)
 Pavarchin (Tiptoe)  (2002, TV series)
 Noghtechin (Dotting)  (2003, TV series)
 Jayezeye Bozorg (Grand Prize)  (2005, TV series)
 Age babam zende bood (If my father was alive) 
 Shabhaye Barareh (Barare Nights)  (2005, TV series)
 Faza Navardan (The Astronauts)  - (2006, TV series)
 Baghe Mozaffar (Mozafar's garden)  - (2006, TV series)
 Marde Hezar Chehreh (Thousand-Face Man) - (2008, TV series)
 Davat (Invitation) - (2008 feature film by Ebrahim Hatamikia)
 Marde Do Hezar Chehreh (Two-Thousand Face Man) - (2009, TV series)
 Ghahve-ye Talkh (Bitter Coffee) - (2010 - 2012, Home Media TV series)
 Vilaye Man (My Villa) - (2012 - 2013, Home Media TV series)
 Ganje Mozaffar (Mozafar's treasure) - (2013, Home Media TV series)
 Shookhi Kardam (I'm just kidding) - (2013 - 2014, Home Media TV series)
 Dar Hashiye (AT Hashieh) - (2015, TV series)
 Dorehami (Gathering) - (2016, Telecast)
 5 afternoon - (2017, comedy film)
 Joker - (2021, Reality TV show)

References

External links 

1968 births
Living people
Iranian comedians
People from Tehran
Iranian film directors
Male actors from Tehran
Iranian male film actors
Iranian male television actors
Islamic Azad University, Central Tehran Branch alumni